Simone Tognon (born 25 June 1975) is an Italian former professional footballer who played as a midfielder. He made one Serie A appearance for Juventus in 1995. After his playing career, he became a manager and scout.

Honours 
Juventus

 Serie A: 1994–95

References 

1975 births
Living people
Sportspeople from Padua
Italian footballers
Association football midfielders
Juventus F.C. players
S.P.A.L. players
Rimini F.C. 1912 players

A.C. Prato players
Calcio Padova players
A.S.D. Nuovo Monselice Calcio players
A.C. Este players
Serie A players
Serie B players
Italian football managers
A.C. Este managers
Abano Calcio managers
Association football scouts
Footballers from Veneto